Greece were the host nation at the 1906 Intercalated Games in Athens, Greece. 312 athletes, 307 men and 5 women, competed in 70 events in 13 sports.

Medalists

The bronze medal won by the team of Omilos Filomouson Thessaloniki (predecessor of Iraklis Thessaloniki F.C.) is registered to Greece. The team was composed by ethnic Greeks, despite the fact that the city was part of the Ottoman Empire at the time.

References

External links
 http://www.tovima.gr/opinions/article/?aid=172644
 http://www.sansimera.gr/articles/436
http://www.hoa.gr/article/%CE%BC%CE%AD%CF%83%CE%BF-%CE%BF%CE%BB%CF%85%CE%BC%CF%80%CE%B9%CE%AC%CE%B4%CE%B1-1906/

Nations at the 1906 Intercalated Games
1906
Intercalated Games